{{Infobox company 
| name   = East African Portland Cement Company
| logo   =East African Portland Cement Company Logo.jpg
| logo_size =225px
| type   = Public
| foundation     = 1933
| location       = Athi River, Kenya
| key_people     = William Lay Chairman of the Board Simon Kiprono Managing Director  Prof Sarone Ole Sena Director 
| industry       = Construction
| products       = Cement
| revenue        =  KES: 9.21 billion (2012/13)
| net_income     =  KES: 2.49 billion  (2012/13)
| assets         =  KES: 16.13 billion (2012/13)
| equity         =  KES: 7.1 billion (2012/13) 
| homepage       = Homepage
|founder = Blue Circle Industries}}East African Portland Cement Company commonly known by its abbreviation EAPCC, is a Kenyan based construction company specializing in the manufacturing and selling of cement and cement related products.

Overview
EAPCC's headquarters are located in Athi River, a small town about 30 km from Nairobi, Kenya's capital city. The company has operations in Kenya and Uganda.

History
East African Portland Cement Company started as a trading company importing cement mainly from England for early construction work in British East Africa (now Kenya) as an agent of Blue Circle Industries of the United Kingdom. The name Portland was given due to the resemblance in colour of set cement to the Portland stone that was mined on the Isle of Portland in Dorset, England.

In February 1933, the Company was incorporated in Kenya with the first factory in Nairobi's Industrial Area. The Company had one cement mill and used imported clinker from India for cement manufacturing. The production capacity was about 60,000 tonnes of cement at the time.

In December 1956, construction of the Athi River facility started. The factory was commissioned in 1958 and consisted of a rotary kiln, a big cement mill which significantly increased production capacity to 120,000 tonnes per annum.

Over the years, EAPCC greatly expanded its production capacity. The Company can presently produce over 1.3 million tonnes of cement per annum at reduced cost especially with the June 2014 announcement of the construction of a four megawatt power plant would run on waste gases generated by the company factory at a cost of KSh800 million. This plant would lower the annual cost of running the Athi River factory by KSh500 million.

Subsidiaries and Investments
The companies that comprise East Africa Portland Cement include, but are not limited, to the following:

 East African Portland Cement Limited – Athi River, Kenya - 100% Shareholding - The flagship company of the group. This unit engages in the production of cement.
 East African Portland Cement Uganda Limited  – Kampala, Uganda - 100% Shareholding - The principal activity of the Company is the sale of cement purchased from the parent company. It contributed to 1.24% of the group's revenue in the year ended 30 June 2012.

Ownership
The shares of East African Portland Cement are traded on the Nairobi Securities Exchange, under the symbol: PORT'''. The shareholding in the company's stock as at 31 July 2014 was as depicted in the table below:

Board Room Wars
Cementia Holdings, Associated International Cement and Bamburi Cement are all direct or indirect subsidiaries of Lafarge SA. Giving Lafarge 41.7% of EAPCC. While the Government of Kenya claims to controls NSSF's stake, giving the Government 52.3% control of the firm.

This ownership structure has led to boardroom wars on who controls the company. The government has challenged Lafarge's shareholding in EAPCC due to the fact that Lafarge owns 41.7 per cent of East African Portland Cement Company and a further 58.9 per cent of Bamburi Cement; two of three largest producers of the building material in Kenya. Government accuses the firm of violation of antitrust legislation. Lafarge on their part started that they are a financial investor in EAPCC and they do not exert any operational leverage on the EAPCC Board.

The Kenyan courts ruled that EAPCC does not qualify to be a government Parastatal because NSSF shares do not belong to the State but to contributors. This means that the government of Kenya cannot control, hire or fire its management. The ruling also stopped attempts by the government to make Lafarge dilute its stake in EAPCC.
These board room wrangles negatively impacted the EAPCC's share price and market share.

Governance
East African Portland Cement Company is governed by a seven-person Board of Directors with Edwin Muriithi Kinyua serving as the Chairman.

See also
 National Social Security Fund (Kenya)
 Nairobi Securities Exchange
 Lafarge
 Bamburi Cement

References

External links
 East Africa Portland Cement Company Homepage
 Lafarge Homepage
  National Social Security Fund

Companies listed on the Nairobi Securities Exchange
Manufacturing companies established in 1933
1933 establishments in Kenya
Cement companies of Kenya